Dependency, dependent or depend may refer to:

Computer science 
 Dependency (computer science) or coupling, a state in which one object uses a function of another object
 Data dependency, which describes a dependence relation between statements in a program
 Dependence analysis, in compiler theory
 Dependency (UML), a relationship between one element in the Unified Modeling Language
 Dependency relation, a type of binary relation in mathematics and computer science.
 Functional dependency, a relationship between database attributes allowing normalization.
 Dependent type, in computer science and logic, a type that depends on a value
 Hidden dependency, a relation in which a change in many areas of a program produces unexpected side-effects
 Library dependency, a relationship described in and managed by a software dependency manager tool to mitigate dependency hell

Economics 
 Dependant (British English) (Dependent - American English), a person who depends on another as a primary source of income
 Dependency ratio, in economics, the ratio of the economically dependent part of the economy to the productive part
 Dependency theory, an economic worldview that posits that resources flow from poor states to wealthy states

Linguistics 
 Dependent and independent verb forms, distinct verb forms in Goidelic languages used with or without a preceding particle
 Dependency grammar is based on the dependency relation between the lexemes of a sentence
 Dependent clause

Mathematics 
 Dependency relation, a type of binary relation in mathematics and computer science.
 Dependent and independent variables, in mathematics, the variable that depends on the independent variable
 The absence of independence (probability theory)
 Tail dependence, from probability theory
 Serial dependence, in statistics
 Correlation and dependence
 Mean dependence

Medicine and psychology 
 Codependence, a pattern of detrimental behavioral interactions within a dysfunctional relationship
 Dependency need, the real need of the organism, or something that individuals cannot provide for themselves
 Dependent personality disorder, a personality disorder characterized by a pervasive psychological dependence on other people
 Substance dependence, an adaptive state associated with a withdrawal syndrome upon cessation of repeated exposure to a stimulus (e.g., drug intake)
 Physical dependence, dependence that involves persistent physical–somatic withdrawal symptoms (e.g., fatigue and delirium tremens)
 Psychological dependence, dependence that involves emotional–motivational withdrawal symptoms (e.g., dysphoria and anhedonia)
 Alcohol dependence
 Amphetamine dependence
 Barbiturate  dependence
 Benzodiazepine  dependence
 Caffeine  dependence
 Cannabis  dependence
 Cocaine  dependence
 Opioid dependence
 Tanning dependence

Political science 
 Dependent territory, a classification of territory, especially a region that is not a sovereign state but a possession of same
 Crown Dependencies, three specific dependencies of the United Kingdom: the Bailiwick of Guernsey, the Bailiwick of Jersey, and the Isle of Man
 Dependencies of Norway
 Ross Dependency, New Zealand Antarctic claim

Music 
 Dependent (record label), a German independent record label that focuses on aggrotech, electro-industrial and futurepop music
 Dependent Music, an independent Canadian record label, owned and operated by the artists that were a part of the collective
 Dependency (band), an American Christian hardcore band

Philosophy 

 Dependent (origination), in Buddhism, the idea that the existence of everything is conditional and dependent on a cause, and that nothing happens fortuitously or by chance

Other uses 
 Depend (undergarment), a brand of absorbent, disposable underwear for adults
 Dependency (project management), a link amongst a project's terminal elements
 Dependency (religion), the relation of a monastic community with a newer community